The Ven. John Waters Stow, MA (17 January 1912 – 3 July 1971) was Archdeacon of Bermuda from 1951 until 1961.

He was educated at Selwyn College, Cambridge, and Ripon College Cuddesdon;  and ordained in 1938.  After  a curacy in East Wickham he was a Chaplain in the RNVR from 1939 to 1944 when he moved to Portsmouth to serve a second curacy at St Mary, Portsea. He was Rector of St. George, Bermuda from 1947 to 1961;  and then of Hatfield until his death.

References

1912 births
1971 deaths
Alumni of Selwyn College, Cambridge
Alumni of Ripon College Cuddesdon
Royal Naval Volunteer Reserve personnel of World War II
20th-century Anglican priests
Archdeacons of Bermuda
Royal Navy chaplains
World War II chaplains